Vera Yeremenko (born 13 July 1983) is a Kazakhstani alpine skier. She competed in two events at the 2006 Winter Olympics.

References

External links
 

1983 births
Living people
Kazakhstani female alpine skiers
Olympic alpine skiers of Kazakhstan
Alpine skiers at the 2006 Winter Olympics
Sportspeople from Almaty
Alpine skiers at the 2003 Asian Winter Games
Alpine skiers at the 2007 Asian Winter Games